Jean Ballard (14 November 1893 – 18 June 1973) was a French poet, writer and editor.

Early life
Jean Ballard was born in Marseille, France. He grew up in Marseille and passed his Baccalaureate, specialising in mathematics.

Career
Ballard began his writing career with Fortunio, a literary review founded by author Marcel Pagnol. He was the founder and editor of Les Cahiers du Sud from 1925 to 1966.

Death and legacy
Ballard died in 1973 in his hometown of Marseille. He was 79 years old. The Cours Jean Ballard in the 1st arrondissement of Marseille was named in his honour.

References

1893 births
1973 deaths
Writers from Marseille
French poets
French editors